Californios is a Michelin-starred fine dining restaurant in San Francisco, California, serving Mexican cuisine. Its head chef is Val M. Cantu, one of the restaurant's co-owners. Californios earned its first Michelin star in 2015 and then its second in 2017, becoming the first US restaurant serving Mexican cuisine to earn two Michelin stars. Its original Mission District location was closed in 2020. The restaurant was relocated to the South of Market (SoMa) neighborhood in early 2021.

2015–2020: Mission District
A chef Val M. Cantu ran a series of Mexican pop-up restaurants called Californios for two years. He then opened the permanent location using the same name at 3115 22nd Street (near South Van Ness Avenue) of Mission District in January 2015. The site was a former location of prior establishments: Panchita's No. 3 and Latin American restaurant Manos Nouveau. The latter was relocated from its original site in late 2014 and later permanently closed in late 2016.

Californios's seating capacity was eighteen in the dining room and six at the chef's counter, totaling to twenty-four. Reservations only at least one week in advance were accepted. A fee to cancel a reservation within 24 hours was $45. Cantu's wife Carolyn designed the restaurant's interior settings, including greyed storefront windows, "an oasis of dark paneled walls, glittery disk-shaped crystal chandeliers, and tufted banquettes set off with white tablecloths." The interior design was overall dark, and windows were tinted. Amid the COVID-19 pandemic, Californios's original location was closed in 2020.

2021–present: Relocation to SoMa
The restaurant then in early 2021 was relocated to 355 11th Street of the South of Market (SoMa) neighborhood, the former site of Bar Agricole. The new SoMa location's seating capacity, while partially under construction, remained the same as the prior Mission one's, but "a private dining room" was added "to accommodate party requests". The new location would have fitted at least one hundred diners, but Cantu has intended to limit the capacity "to maintain quality", to make the place "more refined" than what the old location was, and to rather not make it "more casual". Furthermore, "stunning, billowing glass chandeliers" and "concrete booths", previously belonging to Bar Agricole, were removed. Floors and walls were remade. The new kitchen equipment "includ[es] a custom hearth and custom smoker from Texas."

The restaurant's capacity was doubled to about fifty seats later that year. The enclosed patio is "painted black and decorated with shade plants and pink hydrangeas". The pre-entrance "sloped passageway" contains "black walls and cream-color[ed] candles".

The location's lease was signed in October to Matarozzi Pelsinger Builders. The location's broker is Maven Commercial Inc.

Menu (Mission)
Cantu's family ran a Mexican restaurant in Brownwood, Texas, in where he was raised. His recipes have blended Mexican and northern Californian cuisines and have been inspired by his maternal grandmother Rosa's. The menu has changed monthly with minor tweaks almost every night and has been set to fixed prices. When Californios debuted at its original Mission District location, the "single-menu option" contained seven courses and costed typically $57. The option shortly expanded to nine courses and rose to $75. A wine pairing also increased from $35 to $45. The menu inflated to $125 for twelve to sixteen courses within the following year and then to $157 in July 2016. It then inflated to $177 for nineteen courses in 2018.

In early 2015, the menu of the old location would begin with small bites, such as "onion chip with [...] caviar and creme fraiche on one end[,] fermented bean puree and chile on the other"; poached oysters with nasturtium; and "kiwi panna cotta topped with apple and celery granita, with a rice-sized pellets" tasting like "Pop Rocks". "[A] mix of greens and herbs, including budding mustard flowers with several kinds of radishes and other vegetables[,]" served as one of starter courses. The dishes served to San Francisco Chronicle food critic Michael Bauer as subsequent courses were "aged yellowtail [fish] [...] with slices of Serrano chiles, finger limes and kumquat"; "a bowl [...] of chicken and slices of radishes with [...] pomegranate seeds on the bottom"; a bowl of potato "with a fried chip set on dilled mashed potatoes" and "chipotle puree"; roasted avocado halves stuffed "with farro, morels[,] chanterelles" and "puffed rice" toppings; rare pato (duck) breast with "fennel salad" and "cumin jus"; "almond panna cotta [...] with makrut cream" and citrus variations; and "foie gras ice cream on [...] hazelnut brittle with bruleed banana slices". Other dishes served to Bauer as additional courses of expanded menu a while after the restaurant's debut were "steamed roasted tomato custard" with caviar and avocado chips; and Fort Bragg black cod on a "Shishito pepper mole, topped with fried Brussels sprouts".

The menu also included "vanilla bean cookies[,] and fruit gelees" and white chocolate pralines"; a sablefish poached in olive oil; "Grain and Chicken Broth"; and "Yerba Buena Fruit Cup".

In 2017, the menu would begin with green apple agua fresca. A dish served to Bauer as one of subsequent courses was Cantu's signature dish Tres Frijoles, containing the following ingredients: "pickled shallots [...] topped with whole Rancho Gordo beans, [...] marrow bean liquor", lightly whipped "frosting of corona beans", ossetra caviar, and tiny gold leaf flakes. Other dishes were "miniature red corn taco [...] filled with butter-poached lobster glazed with Peruvian Aji Amarillo sauce and shaved fennel"; a "banana leaf"-wrapped "two-bite tamale [...] stuffed with pureed black beans and house-smoked cheese"; jicama-made empanada; a chicharron containing "thin slices of house-cured, air-dried Wagyu beef and sprigs of flowering purslane"; a "soft-shell crab seasoned with habanero aioli, seaweed and pickled squash blossoms on a[n] ['Oaxacan green masa'-made] soft tortilla"; a smoked squab broth "with pomegranate seeds"; a yogurt with vegetables, such as "sweet peppers, okra and yellow wax beans", and Fresno chile agua fresca on the side; a "ceviche with coconut water" and sea bream from Tokyo's Tsukiji fish market; a carne asada containing "A5 Wagyu beef" with "sauteed chanterelles[,] whole onions, [and] deep-fried mustard greens"; finger-sized Mount Lassen trout on a carrot broth "with gooseberries".

One of dishes served as the main course was smoked squab with "raw plums, plum jam and small Tokyo turnips and leeks". Served as palate cleansers were "Syrah gelee with olive oil, Chardonnay grape granita and [...] nitrogen-frozen grapes". The dessert menu included goat cheese with a shortbread and blackberries; Bartlett pear with macadamia butter; and vanilla ice cream with Alpine strawberries and sauce on the side. Digestives served after dessert courses at the end of the menu included "white peach juice, vermouth and limequat".

Menu (SoMa)
After Californios relocated to the South of Market neighborhood, a tasting menu was priced $223 in March 2021. The menu of its new location would begin with eight small bites, including "chicharron topped with caviar and black truffle, and a Dungeness crab-filled taquito made with thinly sliced kohlrabi." Some of subsequent courses were a fish taco using "fried local cod and a sourdough tortilla"; and "a vanilla semifreddo" topped with "a rainbow-colored granita[,] flavored with huckleberry, mandarin, meyer lemon, kiwi and pea flowers", the latter stated by the menu as a "homage to our new home in the Leather and LGBTQ Cultural District of San Francisco".

By summer 2021, the menu included a rockfish taco; a squab breast taco; "golden orbs" (extracted from locally-grown partially ripe peaches) with chamoy and chilhuacle pepper; de-boned "chicken wing, glazed with a sauce of smoky chile morita and celery"; grilled banana with granola and golden ossetra; cochinita pibil including grilled fruit and caviar; a Veracruz-based infladita containing fried black masa and sea urchin roe; "a guajillo chili atole, a corn flour-based drink"; a Guerrero-based chilapita containing masa and "smoked sturgeon mousse"; an arepa "wrapped in a scarf of squash blossom", inspired by Cantu's Venezuelan mother's cooking; a dessert bar made with "jivara chocolate mousse, tonka bean bavarois, and royal tioga cherr[y] [toppings]", which Soleil Ho compared to a Mexican candy product Bubu Lubu. Side dishes served as garnishes to accompany courses included "emulsified salsa verde, key lime 'cheeks', lime-pickled onions and thick slices of fermented carrot".

Reception
Food critic Michael Bauer of San Francisco Chronicle visited the original location of Californios three times and then in March 2015 rated it overall, the food, service, and atmosphere three out of four stars each. Later in October 2017, Bauer rated it overall, the food, and service four out of four stars each and its atmosphere three out of four. He did not list Californios as one of his top ten new San Francisco restaurants of 2015. Nevertheless, he listed it as one of his top 100 restaurants in 2016 and then in 2018.

Californios received its first Michelin star in October 2015 and then its second in October 2017, becoming the first Mexican restaurant in the US to earn two Michelin stars. As of August 2021, it remains the only two-Michelin-starred Mexican restaurant in the US.

Chef and restaurateur
Val M. Cantu graduated in 2006 from the University of Texas at Austin, where he studied business and English literature. Cantu began his hospitality career by working for a Japanese restaurant Uchi in Austin, Texas, and worked for other restaurants, such as a Mexican restaurant Pujol in Mexico City and a California-inspired restaurant Sons & Daughters as a sous chef in San Francisco. While working for Uchi, he attended Austin Community College.

Cantu, his wife Carolyn, and his sister-in-law Charlotte Randolph, beverage director of Californios and former employee of another restaurant the French Laundry, have co-owned the restaurant throughout its run in old and new locations.

Food & Wine magazine named him one of "Best New Chefs" of 2017.

References

Further reading

External links
 
 

2015 establishments in California
2020 disestablishments in California
2021 establishments in California
Mexican restaurants in California
Michelin Guide starred restaurants in California
Mission District, San Francisco
Restaurants established in 2015
Restaurants in San Francisco
South of Market, San Francisco
Restaurants disestablished in 2020
Restaurants established in 2021
Fine dining